Olmarch is a hamlet in the community of Llangybi, Ceredigion, Wales, which is 59.9 miles (96.4 km) from Cardiff and 172.1 miles (277 km) from London. Olmarch is represented in the Senedd by Elin Jones (Plaid Cymru) and the Member of Parliament is Ben Lake (Plaid Cymru).

References

See also 

 Olmarch Halt railway station
 List of localities in Wales by population

Villages in Ceredigion